Metrical Phonology: A Course Book is a 1987 book by Richard M. Hogg and C. B. McCully in which the authors provide an introduction to a theory of metrical phonology.

Reception
The book was reviewed by Irene Vogel, Michael Jessen and Geert Booij.

References

External links
Metrical Phonology: A Course Book
1987 non-fiction books
Phonology books
Linguistics textbooks
Cambridge University Press books